Haukur Óskarsson  (5 January 1915 – 13 March 1989) was an Icelandic footballer. He was part of the Iceland national football team between 1946 and 1947. He played 2 matches.

See also
 List of Iceland international footballers

References

External links
 

1915 births
1989 deaths
Haukur Oskarsson
Haukur Oskarsson
Haukur Oskarsson
Association footballers not categorized by position